Hasanabad (also Romanized as Ḩasanābād; also known as Hastanābād and Ḩoseynābād) is a village in Amanabad Rural District, in the Central District of Arak County, Markazi Province, Iran. At the 2006 census, its population was 126, in 36 families.

References 

Populated places in Arak County